Dying to Live may refer to:

 Dying to Live (2008 film), a documentary film by Ben Mittleman
 Dying to Live (2018 film), an Australian film about organ and tissue donation
Dying to Live, a 1999 fantasy film by Rob Hedden
 Dying to Live (novel), by Kim Paffenroth
 Dying to Live (Derek Minor album), 2011
 Dying to Live (13 album), 2015
 Dying to Live (Kodak Black album), 2018
 "Dying to Live", a song by Edgar Winter from the 1971 album Edgar Winter's White Trash
 "Dying to Live", a song by Steven Curtis Chapman from the 1987 album First Hand
 "Dying to Live", a song by Exciter from the 1988 album Exciter
 "Dying to Live", a song by Scott Stapp from the 2013 album Proof of Life

See also
 "Runnin' (Dying to Live)", a 2002 song by Tupac Shakur and The Notorious B.I.G.